Jack Weinstein may refer to:

 Jack B. Weinstein (1921–2021), American judge
 Jack Weston (born Morris Weinstein; 1924–1996), American actor
 Jack Weinstein (Medal of Honor) (1928–2006), U.S. Army soldier and Medal of Honor recipient
 Jack Weinstein (general), U.S. Air Force general
 Jack Russell Weinstein (born 1969), American philosopher

See also 
Jay Weston (born John Martin Weinstein, 1929–2023), American film producer and restaurant critic